Do It in the AM is the second studio album by English recording artist Frankmusik. It was released in the United Kingdom on 26 September 2011 by Island Records. Preceding its release, the album's eponymous official lead single "Do it in the AM", which features labelmates Far East Movement, was released in the US on 3 May 2011 and in the UK on 1 August 2011. The album's title was revealed in a press release issued on Frankmusik's Myspace page.

Background and development
On 29 September 2009, Frankmusik stated on his Twitter page that he had begun working upon new material for Do it in the AM. In November 2009, he moved to Los Angeles because he "wanted to sever any semblance of a safety net." He later stated in an interview that he made the move to LA because he "needed to have a fresh start, just to keep creative. Keep the story interesting, you know? Just move on." In 2010, it was announced that Frankmusik had been signed to Cherrytree Records, an imprint of Interscope Records, by its founder, Martin Kierszenbaum.

By the end of 2010, Frankmusik had already announced the release of a promo single off the record, "The Fear Inside".

Composition
Upon comparing Do It in the AM to his debut album, Complete Me (2009), Frankmusik stated:

In that same interview, he also stated that "there's a lot of 'twinsies' kind of tracks on the album. I have, like, this one week of being in this one particular zone, into this one sound, so there's a lot of tracks that are kind of like grouped." He cited "The Fear Inside" and another song off the album, "Running", as prime examples of this concept. In an interview with Digital Spy, he expressed interest in working with fellow English singer-songwriter Ellie Goulding on a track for the album. Frankmusik worked previously with Goulding to produce the song "Wish I Stayed" on her debut album Lights.

Release
On 26 September 2011, it was announced that Frankmusik would release thirteen free tracks on his official website, which will be available to those who have bought Do It in the AM either physically or digitally, with a unique activation code included with each format. The new songs will be unveiled every Friday up until Christmas and will become part of Frankmusik's The Voyage Collection. According to him, "These songs were chosen as a behind the scenes glance into what never makes the record." The downloads were available for a limited time, but became unavailable after Frankmusik was dropped by Island Records.

Singles
"The Fear Inside" was released as a buzz single in November 2009. The music video premiered on 2 December 2010 and was directed by G. An EP was released on the UK iTunes Store on 19 December 2010, while a remix EP was released on the US iTunes Store on 18 January 2011. "Do It in the AM" was released as the album's official lead single on 3 May 2011 and features Far East Movement. Follow-up single "No I.D." was released on 6 September 2011 and features Colette Carr.

Commercial performance
Upon its release the album failed to chart, and by 2013 was reported to have sold 2,000 copies in the US according to Nielsen Soundscan.

Track listing
 All tracks produced by Frankmusik and Cherry Cherry Boom Boom
 Additional production on tracks 3 and 7 by Billboard

Personnel
 Frankmusik – vocals, producer, instrumentation, programming
 Billboard – additional producer (tracks 3, 7)
 Louis Bloom – A&R
 Colette Carr – vocals (track 2)
 Far East Movement – vocals (track 3)
 Cassandra Gracey – management
 Gene Grimaldi – mastering
 Martin "Cherry Cherry Boom Boom" Kierszenbaum – producer, instrumentation, programming
 Natalia Kills – vocals (track 4)
 Robert Orton – mixing
 Jam Sutton – photography

Release history

References

2011 albums
Frankmusik albums
Island Records albums